Gandhi Institute of Engineering and Technology University (GIET University)() is a university located at Gunupur, in the state of Odisha, India  established in 1997 by “Vidya Bharati Educational Trust''. The Odisha government issued a gazette notification for award of the university status to GIET Gunupur in December 2018.
GIET University, formerly known as Gandhi Institute of Engineering and Technology, is a leading university located in Gunupur, Odisha, India. The university was established in 1997 by the Vidya Bharati Educational Trust, with a vision to promote technical education in India and provide quality education in highly disciplined and conductive surroundings with international standards.

GIET University offers undergraduate, postgraduate and doctoral programs in various fields of engineering, technology, management, and computer applications. The university is approved by the University Grants Commission (UGC) and is accredited by the National Assessment and Accreditation Council (NAAC) with an 'A' grade.

The university has state-of-the-art infrastructure and facilities, including modern classrooms, well-equipped laboratories, a central library, and sports facilities. The faculty at GIET University comprises highly qualified and experienced professionals who are committed to providing an exceptional educational experience to the students.

Since its inception, the university has been dedicated to providing quality technical education and has established itself as a leading institution in Odisha. The university has also been actively involved in research and innovation and has collaborated with industry partners to provide students with hands-on experience and exposure to the latest technologies and industry trends.

GIET University has a strong alumni network, with graduates working in top companies and organizations around the world. The university is committed to nurturing the next generation of leaders and innovators and providing them with the skills and knowledge to excel in their chosen fields.

In conclusion, GIET University is a premier institution for technical education in India, with a rich history of providing quality education and promoting innovation and research. The university is dedicated to shaping the future of its students and preparing them to be leaders in their respective fields.

Managing Trustee 
Edu-entrepreneur Dr. Satya Prakash Panda ( President)  and Dr. Chandra Dhwaj Panda ( Vice-President)  founded a trust called Vidya Bharati Education Trust which is a non-governmental organization, established in the year 1996. The Vidya Bharti Education Trust is a conglomerate of educational institutions.

Schools of GIET University, Gunupur 
GIETU includes the following schools:
 School of Engineering and Technology
 School of Humanities & Social Studies
 School of Agriculture
 School of Sciences
 School of Management Studies (SMS)

Affiliations 

 Conferred the University status in 2018 through an act of Odisha Legislative Assembly (approved by UGC, New Delhi)
 Incorporated in the list of Universities in 2019 under the UGC Act, 1956
 Seven B-Tech branches of GIETU accredited five times by the National Board of Accreditation (NBA) from 2017-2022 for their first-rate technical education methods.
 Accredited by the National Assessment and Accreditation Council (NAAC), UGC has a high point grade for 2015-2020.
 Recognized by the Department of Scientific and Industrial Research (DSIR) as an institution of high-quality research.
 Approved by the All India Council for Technical Education (AICTE), New Delhi, since 1997.

Research & Development 
GIET University has maintained the highest All India Council for Technical Education (AICTE), Department of Science and Technology (DST), Department of Biotechnology (DBT), Ministry of Micro, Small and Medium Enterprises (MSME) Industry-sponsored projects in Odisha. This shows the quality, quantity and influence of research at GIET University. Starting from renewable energy technology to Optical Fibre Communication, GIET University is truly leading the way into the future with its research and innovation.

Awards & Ranking 

‘Best University award for Innovation and Campus Placement’ in the International Education Pride Awards 2021. 
‘Best Disciplined University for Academics and Ambience’ in the Nation’s Education Pride Awards 2021.
‘Best University in Eastern India’ for Campus placement at the Asia Education Summit & Awards 2020.
Band B (Rank 26th -50th) in the Atal Ranking of Institutions on Innovation Achievements (ARIIA) Rankings 2020 of the Ministry of Human Resource and Development (MHRD)
energy conservation award for the best efforts in energy conservation from the Department of Energy, Govt. Of Odisha
came out on top in the Pvt. Engineering College category of the CSR & GHRDC survey 2019.
first prize for green building design from Indian Green Building Council (IGBC)

Academic Programmes 
GIET University conducts four-year B.Tech, B.SC Agriculture, 3 years BBA and 2 years M.Sc, M.Tech programme in various disciplines: GIET University offers some of the most sought-after programmes including 14 undergraduates and 20 postgraduate programmes. In addition to undergraduate and postgraduate courses, GIETU also offers full-time and part time Ph.D. degrees in Engineering, Natural Sciences and Management disciplines.

B.Tech 
 Chemical Engineering
 Mechanical Engineering
 Computer Science Engineering 
 Electronics & Communication Engineering
 Electrical & Electronics Engineering
 Biotechnology
 Electrical Engineering
 Civil Engineering
 Petrochemical & Refinery Engineering  
 Agricultural Engineering

M.Tech 
 Heat Power and Thermal Engg. 
 Biotechnology
 Chemical Engineering
 Computer Science & Engineering 
 Electronics & Communication Engineering
 Power Electronics Engg.
 Machine Design
 Structural Engineering
 Construction Technology and Management
 Manufacturing Technology

MCA 
 Masters Of Computer Application

MBA 
 Entrepreneurial Management
 Human Resource
 Marketing
 Finance
 System Management
 Production Operation Management
 Rural Management
 Data Analytics
 E-commerce
 Digital Marketing

M.Sc  
 M.Sc Biotechnology
 M.Sc Physics
 M.Sc Chemistry
 M.Sc Mathematics
 M.Sc Life Science

M.A Courses 
 M.A English 
 M.A Economics
 M.A Education

Degree Courses 
 Bachelor of Business Administration (BBA)
 B.Sc. (Agriculture)
 Bachelor of Computer Applications (BCA)
 B.Sc. in Nursing

Ph.D courses 
 Ph.D. Mechanical Engineering
 Ph.D. Computer Science Engineering
 Ph.D. Electrical & Electronics Engineering
 Ph.D. Electrical Engineering
 Ph.D. Electronics & Communication Engineering
 Ph.D. Civil Engineering
 Ph.D. Chemical Engineering
 Ph.D. Biotechnology
 Ph.D. Business Management 
 Ph.D. Physics
 Ph.D. Chemistry 
 Ph.D. Mathematics
 Ph.D. Zoology
 Ph.D. Botany

References

External links 

 

Universities in Odisha
Educational institutions established in 1997
1997 establishments in Orissa